The Nattukkottai Chettiar Temple (Tamil:நாட்டுக்கோட்டை செட்டியார் ஆலயம்) is a temple of the Chettiar community in Penang, Malaysia. Its full name is Nattukkottai Chettiar Thendayuthapani Temple, also called the Arulmigu Thandayuthapani Temple. The procession of silver chariot during Thaipusam eve ends here.

References

Hindu temples in Malaysia
Religious buildings and structures in Penang
Tourist attractions in George Town, Penang